Eta Ursae Majoris (Latinised from η Ursae Majoris, abbreviated Eta UMa, η UMa), formally named Alkaid , is a star in the constellation of Ursa Major. It is the most eastern (leftmost) star in the Big Dipper (or Plough) asterism. However, unlike most stars of the Big Dipper, it is not a member of the Ursa Major moving group. With an apparent visual magnitude of +1.84, it is the third-brightest star in the constellation and one of the brightest stars in the night sky.

Physical properties
Eta Ursae Majoris is a 10-million-year-old B-type main sequence star with a stellar classification of B3 V. Since 1943, the spectrum of this star has served as one of the stable anchor points by which other stars are classified. It has six times the mass; 3.4 times the radius, and is radiating around 594 times as much energy as the Sun. Its outer atmosphere has an effective temperature of about 15,540 K, giving it the blue-white hue of a B-type star.

Eta Ursae Majoris was listed as a standard star for the spectral type B3 V. It has broadened absorption lines due to its rapid rotation, which is common in stars of this type. However, the lines are very slightly distorted and variable, which may be caused by some emission from a weak disk of material produced by the rapid rotation.

Eta Ursae Majoris is a relatively nearby and bright star and has been examined closely, but no exoplanets or companion stars have been discovered.

Nomenclature
η Ursae Majoris (Latinised to Eta Ursae Majoris) is the star's Bayer designation.

It bore the traditional names Alkaid (or Elkeid from the Arabic القايد القائد) and Benetnasch . Alkaid derives from the Arabic phrase meaning "The leader of the daughters of the bier". The daughters of the bier, i.e. the mourning maidens, are the three stars of the handle of the Big Dipper, Alkaid, Mizar, and Alioth; while the four stars of the bowl, Megrez, Phecda, Merak, and Dubhe, are the bier. In 2016, the International Astronomical Union organized a Working Group on Star Names (WGSN) to catalog and standardize proper names for stars. The WGSN's first bulletin of July 2016 included a table of the first two batches of names approved by the WGSN; which included Alkaid for this star.

It is known as Běidǒuqī (北斗七 - the Seventh Star of the Northern Dipper) or Yáoguāng (瑤光 - the Star of Twinkling Brilliance) in Chinese.

The Hindus knew this star as Marīci, one of the Seven Rishis.

In Japan and Korea, Alkaid is known as Hagunsei and Mukokseong respectively ("the military breaking star" or "most corner star"). Both meanings come from ancient China's influence in both countries.

In culture
USS Alkaid (AK-114) was a United States Navy Crater class cargo ship named after the star.

See also
 Lists of stars

References

External links
Alkaid at Jim Kaler's Stars website

Ursae Majoris, Eta
Big Dipper
B-type main-sequence stars
Ursa Major (constellation)
Alkaid
Ursae Majoris, 85
5191
120315
067301
BD+50 2027